Blue Blood is a 2014 Brazilian drama film directed by Lírio Ferreira. It was screened in the Panorama section of the 65th Berlin International Film Festival.

Cast
 Daniel de Oliveira
 Caroline Abras
 Sandra Coverloni
 Rômulo Braga

References

External links
 

2014 films
2014 drama films
2010s Portuguese-language films
Brazilian drama films